David Raju Palaparthi is an elected member of Andhra Pradesh Legislative Assembly. Presently, he is representative of Yerragondapalem constituency. Previously, he was elected as member from Santhanuthalapadu constituency.

Early life 
He was born in Mattigunta Village of Naguluppala Padu Mandal of Prakasham District. He did his graduation in Master of Arts and L.L.B. from Andhra University.

Political career 
His political career was started in the year 1987 as party member in Telugu Desam Party. Later, he rose to Member of Mandal Praja Parishad. After that, he was elected as Chairman to Zilla Praja Parishad. In 1999, for the first time; he was elected as Member of Andhra Pradesh Legislative Assembly from Santhanuthalapadu constituency from Telugu Desam Party. Later, he joined YSR Congress Party in 2010. In 2014, he was elected as Member of Andhra Pradesh Legislative Assembly from Yerragondapalem constituency from YSR Congress Party. But, he shifted to Telugu Desam Party in 2016.

References 

Andhra Pradesh MLAs 2014–2019
Living people
1958 births
Telugu Desam Party politicians
YSR Congress Party politicians